James Cox is a British journalist and broadcaster who had a wide ranging career in newspapers and in broadcasting in Scotland.

After a spell with the Daily Record newspaper in Glasgow he worked on Public Account from 1975 with Donald MacCormick and Andrew Neil and presented Good Morning Scotland on BBC Radio Scotland for many years.

He became the BBC's North America Correspondent based in New York City in 1983 before returning to London as a BBC political correspondent at Westminster and then joining Newsnight on BBC2.

From 1994 to 2005 he was presenter of The World This Weekend on BBC Radio 4.

References

External links

Inside BBC Scotland by Alastair Hetherington p. 48 (Whitewater Press)

British male journalists
Living people
Date of birth missing (living people)
Year of birth missing (living people)